Havers may refer to:

 Havers (automobile), built by the Havers Motor Car Company 1908–14
 Alice Havers (1850–1890), an English painter and illustrator
 Arthur Havers (1898–1980), English golfer
 Barbara Havers, a fictional detective in The Inspector Lynley Mysteries TV series
 Cecil Havers (1889–1977), English barrister and judge
 Clopton Havers (1657–1702), English physician
 Haversian canals, sometimes canals of Havers, microscopic tubes in bone 
 Michael Havers, Baron Havers (1923–1992), British barrister and politician
 Nigel Havers (born 1951), English actor, son of Baron Havers
 Richard Havers (1951–2017), British music writer
 Rob Havers (born 1967), British military historian

See also

 Havens (disambiguation)
 Haver, a surname
 Haversine formula